Isopogon teretifolius, commonly known as nodding coneflower, is a species of flowering plant in the family Proteaceae and is endemic to the southwest of Western Australia It is an erect shrub with cylindrical, sometimes branched leaves, and flattened-spherical heads of hairy pinkish flowers.

Description
The flowers are arranged on the ends of branchlets in sessile, flattened-spherical, sometimes dropping heads  in diameter with hairy, reddish brown, egg-shaped involucral bracts at the base. Flowering occurs from August to November and the fruit is a hairy nut, fused with others in a flattened-spherical to conical head  in diameter.

Taxonomy
Isopogon teretifolius was first formally described in 1810 by Robert Brown in Transactions of the Linnean Society of London. The specific epithet (teretifolius) means "terete-leaved".

Distribution and habitat
Nodding coneflower grows in forest, shrubland and heath and is widely distributed in the Avon Wheatbelt, Esperance Plains, Geraldton Sandplains, Jarrah Forest, Mallee and Swan Coastal Plain biogeographic regions in the south-west of Western Australia.

Conservation status
This isopogon is classified as "not threatened" by the Government of Western Australia Department of Parks and Wildlife.

References

teretifolius
Eudicots of Western Australia
Plants described in 1810
Endemic flora of Western Australia
Taxa named by Robert Brown (botanist, born 1773)